Galliani is a surname. Notable people with the surname include:

 Adrian Galliani (born 2001), American soccer player; grandson of Adriano
 Adriano Galliani (born 1944), Italian entrepreneur and football executive
 Andrea Galliani (born 1988), Italian male volleyball player
 Guillermo Arbulú Galliani (1921–1997), Peruvian general and politician

See also
 Gagliani, surname
 Galliane, part of a musical instrument
 Galliano (disambiguation)

Italian-language surnames